Miroslav Poljak (3 September 1944 – 2 November 2015) was a Croatian water polo player notable for winning a gold medal in Mexico City in 1968, with the Yugoslavian water polo team.

See also
 Yugoslavia men's Olympic water polo team records and statistics
 List of Olympic champions in men's water polo
 List of Olympic medalists in water polo (men)

References

 Umro jedan od najboljih hrvatskih vaterpolista i osvajač zlatne medalje na OI

External links
 

1944 births
2015 deaths
Sportspeople from Zagreb
Croatian male water polo players
Yugoslav male water polo players
Olympic water polo players of Yugoslavia
Olympic gold medalists for Yugoslavia
Water polo players at the 1968 Summer Olympics
Olympic medalists in water polo
Medalists at the 1968 Summer Olympics